The Taiwan Centers for Disease Control (CDC) is the agency of the Ministry of Health and Welfare of Republic of China (Taiwan) that combats the threat of communicable diseases.

Central Epidemic Command Center (CECC) 

The CECC has the authority to coordinate works across government departments and enlist additional personnel during an emergency.

History
The agency was established on 1 July 1999.

Timeline of early warning for COVID-19

TCDC officials saw premonitions of the COVID-19 pandemic in December on social media. As well, medical staff freely transit the Taiwan Strait, so the TCDC was dimly aware that something was awry in December. On 31 December, Wuhan city government stamped paper that required doctors in the city to report all cases of a novel pneumonia to them. On 1 January, the Huanan Seafood City market (HSCM) was shuttered by the health authorities.

By 5 January 2020, the Taiwan CDC began monitoring all individuals who had travelled to Wuhan within fourteen days and exhibited a fever or symptoms of upper respiratory tract infections. These people were screened for 26 known pathogens, including SARS and Middle East respiratory syndrome, and those testing positive were quarantined.

Chuang Yin-ching recounted that "TCDC made a request to the Chinese health authority on 6 January. I was notified on 11 January. I remember that day very clearly because that was the Taiwan presidential election day. Around 6 pm in the afternoon I got a phone call from the director general of the Taiwan CDC that (I and a colleague) had permission to go to Wuhan. We flew there the next night for a meeting on 13 and 14 January morning and afternoon in Wuhan."

On 15 January, Chuang and his colleague were summoned to the Director-General of the TCDC. The next morning he was present at the expert task force meeting. This was followed by a press conference on 16 January.

On 20 January 2020, the CECC was activated.

Notable personnel
 Chuang Yin-ching, commander of the Communicable Disease Control Medical Network
Ih-Jen Su, director-general (2003–2005)
Twu Shiing-jer, director-general (2000–2002)

Organizational structure
 Information Management Office
 Secretariat
 Personnel Office
 Civil Service Ethics Office
 Accounting and Statistics Office

Divisions
 Division of Planning and Coordination
 Division of Infection Control and Biosafety
 Division of Acute Infectious Diseases
 Division of Chronic Infectious Diseases
 Division of Preparedness and Emerging Infectious Diseases
 Division of Quarantine
 Epidemic Intelligence Center
 Center for Diagnostics and Vaccine Development

Centers
 Taipei Regional Center
 Northern Regional Center
 Central Regional Center
 Eastern Regional Center
 Southern Regional Center
 Kaohsiung-Pingtung Regional Center

Transportation
The headquarter center is accessible and within walking distance south of Shandao Temple Station of Taipei Metro.

Methadone program 
The agency subsidizes a methadone maintenance treatment program in Taiwan. This includes providing methadone for addicts as well as providing psychiatrists, nurses, and case works, additionally the program "also provides educational programs for specific patients who were under conditions of deferred prosecution."

See also
 Healthcare in Taiwan

References

External links 

 

1999 establishments in Taiwan
Executive Yuan
Government agencies established in 1999
Government of Taiwan
Public health organizations
National public health agencies
Medical research institutes in Taiwan